Henry Wax Karnes (September 8, 1812August 16, 1840) was notable as a soldier and figure of the Texas Revolution, as well as the commander of General Sam Houston's "Spy Squad" at the Battle of San Jacinto.

Biography
Henry Wax Karnes, a native of Tennessee, first visited Texas in 1828.  He returned to Texas during the Texas Revolution; he was one of Sam Houston's most important spies and worked closely with Deaf Smith. He fought with Smith, Seguín, and James Bowie in the battle of Concepción and then joined the siege of Bexar. While serving in a volunteer company, Karnes was sent with Smith to learn the fate of the Alamo.  By the time of the Battle of San Jacinto, he had become a captain and later was a colonel.

After the war, he served in the Texas Rangers. Karnes and Seguin teamed up as part of a campaign to calm the Comanche threat in Texas. He was wounded by an arrow in the Arroyo Seco Fight, an operation against the Comanches in August 1838.  He died of yellow fever during 1840 in San Antonio, Texas.

Karnes was buried outside of Old Campo Santos Cemetery as he was a Protestant, and only Catholics were allowed to be buried there.  This cemetery was later moved and Santa Rosa Hospital was built in its place across from Milam Park.  A monument to Karnes was erected in the park in 1932, as this was the closest to his grave that the city knew of.

Legacy

Both Karnes County and Karnes City, its county seat, are named after him.

There is a historical marker dedicated to Karnes located in San Antonio. He is also commemorated in the Texas Heroes Monument.

See also

John Coker
Young Perry Alsbury
Battle of San Jacinto
Deaf Smith
Sam Houston
Antonio López de Santa Anna
Vicente Filisola
José de Urrea
Martín Perfecto de Cos
Juan Almonte
Timeline of the Texas Revolution
Runaway Scrape
Vince's Bridge

References

Account of Karnes fight on the Arroyo Seco in 1838 from Indian Wars and Pioneers of Texas by John Henry Brown, published 1880.

External links
Santa Anna's Account of the Battle
San Jacinto
Read  Henry Karnes' entry in Biographical Encyclopedia of Texas hosted by the Portal to Texas History. Dead Link.

Karnes County, TX Genealogy
 Account of Karnes fight on the Arroyo Seco in 1838 from Indian Wars and Pioneers of Texas by John Henry Brown published 1880, hosted by The Portal to Texas History

1812 births
1840 deaths
19th-century American people
Military personnel from San Antonio
Members of the Texas Ranger Division
People of the Texas Revolution
Deaths from yellow fever
Infectious disease deaths in Texas
People from Hawkins County, Tennessee
Karnes County, Texas